Natasha Maria Hanako Kuchiki (born October 28, 1976) is an American former competitive pair skater. She is the 1991 World bronze medalist with Todd Sand.

Personal life 
Kuchiki was born in Burbank, California. Her parents, Denise and Sashi, were competitive figure skaters who met in the Ice Capades. She grew up with her parents traveling with Ice Capades until the age of five. Her parents retired from the ice shows in 1981 and settled in Los Angeles, California. Her sister, Tamara, was also a competitive figure skater.

In 2010, Kuchiki married Jamie Loper, an American figure skater who later performed in Disney On Ice shows.

Career 
Kuchiki's parents taught her figure skating until the age of 8 and then asked Wendy Halber Olson to coach her in singles. Her parents initially opposed her wish to skate pairs, preferring that she stay in singles, but changed their minds after seeing potential.

In 1986, Kuchiki teamed up with Richard Alexander. Training only two days a week, one session a day, the pair reached the 1987 U.S. Championships in Tacoma, Washington. Competing in junior pairs, they placed 11th in 1987, won the bronze medal in 1988 and silver in 1989. In March 1989, Kuchiki and Alexander ended their partnership. Kuchiki also finished 4th in novice ladies' at the 1988 U.S. Championships and competed in the junior ladies' event at the 1989 U.S. Championships.

Kuchiki was partnered with Todd Sand in April 1989. They won three senior pairs medals at the U.S. Championships, including gold in 1991, and competed at three World Championships, winning bronze in 1991. They also competed at the 1992 Winter Olympics, where they placed 6th. Kuchiki and Sand announced the end of their partnership in April 1992.

Kuchiki returned the following year to compete in the ladies' singles event at the 1993 U.S. Nationals, finishing 12th. In late 1993, she teamed up with Rocky Marval, with whom she finished fourth at the 1994 U.S. Championships, missing the 1994 Olympic team. Kuchiki retired from competitive skating in 1994.

Professional career
In 1994, Kuchiki joined Dorothy Hamill's Ice Capades "Hansel & Gretel" production. She continued on with Ice Capades until it closed in 1997. After joining "Gershwin On Ice" for a few cities she went on to work for FELD Entertainment, Inc. in 1998 "Grease On Ice" as Frenchie till 2000. In 2000 through 2004 she played "Jane" in "Tarzan" in the Disney On Ice "Jungle Adventures". She learned the acrobatics aerial act called the Spanish Web, learning the aerial acrobatics with her "Tarzan" professional ice skater Jamie Loper. With partner Jamie Loper, Kuchiki performed tandem aerial acrobatics with skates on.

In 2004, Kuchiki joined Disney on Ice's "Beauty & the Beast" where she portrayed the role of "Belle". Still with the company FELD Entertainment- Disney On Ice, she toured with Disney on Ice as a principal skater, Mulan and Jasmine in the "100 Years of Magic" show (from 2005). She retired from touring in 2015 and turned to coaching in Houston.

Competitive highlights

Ladies' singles

Pairs with Sand

Pairs with Marval

Professional ice shows
 1994–1995: Dorothy Hamills Ice Capades "Hansel & Gretel"
 1995–1996: Ice Capades "Cinderella"
 1996–1997: Ice Capades "The Magic of MGM"
 1997       On Ice "Gershwin On Ice"
 1998–2000: Feld Entertainments "Grease On Ice" portrayed the role of "Frenchie"
 2000–2004: Disney On Ice "Jungle Adventures" portrayed the role of "Jane" in Tarzan
 2004–2005: Disney On Ice "Beauty and the Beast" portrayed the role of "Belle"
 2007       Disney's "High School Musical" portrayed the role of "Gabriella"
 2005–2015: Disney On Ice "100 Years of Magic" portrays the role of "Mulan" and "Jasmine"

References

Navigation

American female pair skaters
Figure skaters at the 1992 Winter Olympics
Olympic figure skaters of the United States
Living people
World Figure Skating Championships medalists
1976 births
Competitors at the 1990 Goodwill Games
21st-century American women
20th-century American women